David Graves Mugar (April 27, 1939 – January 25, 2022) was an Armenian-American businessman from Belmont, Massachusetts. He was a member of the Mugar family of Greater Boston. He was CEO and chair of Mugar Enterprises. His father, Stephen P. Mugar was the founder of the Star Market supermarket chain, and was also a major Boston-area philanthropist.

Life and career
Mugar was born on April 27, 1939. He attended the Cambridge School of Weston and in 1962 graduated from Babson College.

He worked as an executive producer of Boston's Fourth of July celebration, which is organized by the Boston 4 Celebrations Foundation (a not-for-profit organization founded by Mugar).

In 2011, Mugar was embroiled in controversy when it was discovered that the CBS National coverage of Boston's Fourth of July celebration included "fake" fireworks clips. Graphics were digitally altered so that during the broadcast, fireworks were seemingly exploding behind famous Boston landmarks, such as Home Plate at Fenway Park, the Massachusetts State House, and Faneuil Hall. A research scientist from Brighton, MA, Karl Clodfelter, and a computer programmer from Ostrander, OH, David Perry, noticed the geographical impossibility of these clips and alerted the Boston Globe. A front-page story in the newspaper on July 8, 2011 broke the story to the public.

The Mugar Omni Theater at the Museum of Science, Boston was named after Mugar's parents. David Mugar was also a Museum trustee. Boston University's Mugar Memorial Library, the University's main study and research library, is named after his grandparents.

In 2002, Mugar gave $5,000,000 for a new wing at the Cape Cod Hospital, in Hyannis, Massachusetts.

According to the Federal Election Commission, in 2011 Mugar donated $250,000 to Restore Our Future, Inc., the super PAC supporting Mitt Romney's presidential campaign.

He died on January 25, 2022, at the age of 82.

References 

1939 births
2022 deaths
American food company founders
American people of Armenian descent
People from Greater Boston
Philanthropists from Massachusetts
Babson College alumni
American chairpersons of corporations
American chief executives of food industry companies
Trustees of museums
People from Belmont, Massachusetts